Mookkannoor Govt. Higher Secondary school is a school situated at Mookkannoor Gram Panchayath, Ernakulam District, Kerala, India. The school is situated in Angamaly assembly constituency. The school was established on 1931. The school is situated near St. Mary's Forane church in Angamaly-Ezattumugham Road.

History
The school was started as in 1913. by St. Marys Church.

Amenities
All high school and higher secondary school as now upgraded to smart class rooms by KITES.

Curriculum
The school follows Kerala State Syllabus of Education (SCERT) for classes from 1st to 12th. In 2012 the school scored 100% victory in SSLC Examination.

Buildings
The school has two double storied buildings and a single storied building. The higher secondary campus and the playground is situated in nearby campus. There a doubly storied building and a single storied building for higher secondary school.

Notable alumni
K P Hormis

Gallery

References

See also
List of schools in Ernakulam district
SSLC
Secondary School
Education in Kerala

Schools in Ernakulam district
High schools and secondary schools in Kerala